Georg August Wallin (Yrjö Aukusti Wallin, aka Abd al-Wali; 24 October 1811 – 23 October 1852) was a Finnish orientalist, explorer and professor remembered for his journeys in the Middle East during the 1840s.

The Finnish translators of Wallin's letters state that Wallin has become a kind of "patron saint of Finnish oriental research". Among other things, the Finnish Oriental Society holds its annual meeting on his birthday. Internationally, it has been estimated that Wallin was one of the most capable Europeans to set foot in Arabia. His qualifications have been compared to U. J. Seetzen and J. L. Burckhardt, because he has been characterized as an Arabian scholar as the first modern explorer to prepare carefully for his mission, with no intention of leaving anything new to be said to his future. Wallin's notes were inaccurate, but he did not carry other research tools with him.

Kaj Öhrnberg notes in his book that Wallin's international reputation was at its highest right after his research trips. He was the first to collect Bedouin poetry and make observations of Bedouin dialects; his observations of Arabic phonetics remained important until the 20th century; he was the first to delve into the study of spoken Arabic. Today, however, Wallin has become a footnote to textbooks after research has gone past him.

Biography 
Wallin was born in the municipality of Sund, Åland in 1811, and his parents were registrar Israel Wallin (1777–1839) and Johanna Maria Ahrenberg (1779–1854). He attended Cathedral School of Åbo in Turku and moved to Rauma with the school after the Great Fire of Turku in 1827. The following year, however, he dropped out of school and studied as a student in private. In 1829 he enrolled to study Oriental Languages at the University of Helsinki, graduating with an MA in 1836. He then began writing a dissertation about Arabic and Persian, while working as a librarian in the university library.

In 1839 he travelled to St. Petersburg, where he met Sheikh Muhammad 'Ayyad al-Tantawi and learned more about the Middle East. He made his first expedition to the area in 1843.

When Wallin went for his expeditions he portrayed himself as a Muslim and took the name Abd al-Wali in order to get closer to his subjects. Many people believe Wallin converted to Islam, but there is no proof to support that claim at least according to his diaries and letters. His grave in Hietaniemi cemetery in Helsinki has his Arabic name engraved over it with Arabic letters. He is buried on Christian church ground.

He visited Mecca in 1845, a city otherwise forbidden to non-Muslims, on his first expedition, which took him from Cairo to Ma'an, Al Jauf, Jubba, Ha'il, Medinah, Mecca, and Jiddah.

On his second expedition between 1846 and 1848, he visited Palestine and Persia. During this time he may have adopted Islam, although his writings indicate scepticism toward religion.

By 1850 Wallin had returned to Europe, where the Royal Geographical Society published his Notes taken during a Journey through part of Northern Arabia and awarded him a 25 guinea prize in recognition of his ground-breaking research. Wallin completed his doctoral thesis in 1851 and was subsequently appointed Professor of Oriental Literature at the University of Helsinki.
He was asked by both the Royal and Russian Geographical Societies to mount another expedition to the Middle East, but declined, perhaps in part due to failing health.

He wrote that he found European culture oppressive and that he "couldn't adapt [him]self to Europe any more". Whatever the cause, Wallin died unexpectedly on 23 October 1852, only three years after his return to Finland and a day before his forty-first birthday.

Wallin's collected journey writings were published posthumously in the 1860s, edited by S. G. Elmgren. A complete edition of his writings was published in Swedish language (partially in translations) during 2010–2017. An English-language and an Arabic-language translation of this edition are being planned.

Bibliography 
 Notes Taken During a Journey Though Part of Northern Arabia in 1848. Published by the Royal Geographical Society in 1851. (Online version.)
 Narrative of a Journeys From Cairo to Medina and Mecca by Suez, Arabia, Tawila, Al-Jauf, Jubbe, Hail and Nejd, in 1845, Royal Geographical Society, 1854
 William R. Mead, G. A. Wallin and the Royal Geographical Society, Studia Orientalia 23, 1958.
 Georg Wallin, reprinted in Travels in Arabia, New York: Oleander Press, 1979:
 Notes taken during a Journey through part of Northern Arabia, Journal of the Royal Geographical Society 20, 1851.
 Narrative of a Journey from Cairo to Medina and Mecca, Journal of the Royal Asiatic Society 24, 1854.
 Narrative of a Journey from Cairo to Jerusalem, Journal of the Royal Geographical Society 25, 1855.
Georg August Wallins Reseanteckningar från Orienten, åren 1843–1849: Dagbok och bref. (Four volumes.) Efter resandens död utgifna af S. G. Elmgren. Helsingfors 1864–1866.
 Yrjö Aukusti Wallin ja hänen matkansa Arabiassa by Julius Krohn (at Project Gutenberg).
 Wallin, Georg August: Skrifter 1: Studietiden och resan till Alexandria. Utgivna av Kaj Öhrnberg och Patricia Berg under medverkan av Kira Pihlflyckt, Svenska litteratursällskapet i Finland, Helsingfors 2010.  (Online version.)
 Wallin, Georg August: Skrifter 2: Det första året i Egypten 1843–1844. Utgivna av Kaj Öhrnberg och Patricia Berg under medverkan av Kira Pihlflyckt, Svenska litteratursällskapet i Finland, Helsingfors 2011.  (Online version.)
 Wallin, Georg August: Skrifter 3: Kairo och resan till Övre Egypten 1844–1845. Utgivna av Kaj Öhrnberg och Patricia Berg under medverkan av Kira Pihlflyckt, Svenska litteratursällskapet i Finland, Helsingfors 2012.  (Online version.)
 Wallin, Georg August: Skrifter 4: Färderna till Mekka och Jerusalem 1845–1847. Utgivna av Kaj Öhrnberg och Patricia Berg under medverkan av Kira Pihlflyckt, Svenska litteratursällskapet i Finland, Helsingfors 2013.  (Online version.)
 Wallin, Georg August: Skrifter 5: Norra Arabiska halvön och Persien 1847–1849. Utgivna av Kaj Öhrnberg, Patricia Berg och Kira Pihlflyckt, Svenska litteratursällskapet i Finland, Helsingfors 2014.  (Online version.)
 Wallin, Georg August: Skrifter 6: Resan hem via London 1849–1850. Utgivna av Kaj Öhrnberg, Patricia Berg och Kira Pihlflyckt, Svenska litteratursällskapet i Finland, Helsingfors 2015.  (Online version.)
 Wallin, Georg August: Skrifter 7: Professorsåren i Helsingfors 1850–1852. Utgivna av Kaj Öhrnberg, Patricia Berg och Kira Pihlflyckt, Svenska litteratursällskapet i Finland, Helsingfors 2016.  (Online version.)
 Wallin, Georg August: Skrifter: Appendix. Material nedtecknat på Arabiska halvön 1845–1848. Utgivna av Kaj Öhrnberg, Patricia Berg och Kira Pihlflyckt, Svenska litteratursällskapet i Finland, Helsingfors 2017.  (Online version.)

Literature
 Patricia Berg, Sofia Häggman, Kaj Öhrnberg, Jaakko Hämeen-Anttila & Heikki Palva; Nina Edgren-Henrichson (Editor): Dolce far niente in Arabia: Georg August Wallin and His Travels in the 1840s. Museum Tusculanum Press, University of Copenhagen 2014. ISBN 978-87-635-4304-0

References

External links
 Georg August Wallin. 375 humanists on 7 March 2015. University of Helsinki.

1811 births
1852 deaths
Explorers of Asia
Explorers of Arabia
Writers from Åland
Christian Hebraists
Academic staff of the University of Helsinki
Finnish orientalists
Arabists
Burials at Hietaniemi Cemetery
Finnish explorers
Hajj accounts